Story Seat was a Canadian children's television series that aired on CBC Television in 1962, in which hosts Lillian Carlson and Norman Young recited and performed stories for young children. The 15-minute shows were broadcast Thursdays at 4:15 p.m. (Eastern time) from 11 January to 28 June 1962.

References

External links
 

CBC Television original programming
1962 Canadian television series debuts
1962 Canadian television series endings
1960s Canadian children's television series
Black-and-white Canadian television shows